Pseudogobio is a genus of cyprinid fish found in eastern Asia.  There are currently four described species in this genus.

Species
 Pseudogobio banggiangensis V. H. Nguyễn, 2001
 Pseudogobio esocinus (Temminck & Schlegel, 1846)
 Pseudogobio guilinensis Yao & Yang, 1977
 Pseudogobio vaillanti (Sauvage, 1878)

References
 

 
Fish of Asia